Love Is Real is the second album by the American lo-fi musician John Maus, released in 2007 on the British label Upset the Rhythm.

Track listing 
 Heaven Is Real (4:16)
 Do Your Best (2:45)
 Rights for Gays (2:36)
 Love Letters From Hell (3:15)
 The Silent Chorus (5:00)
 Navy Seals (2:16)
 Pure Rockets (3:21)
 My Whole World's Coming Apart (3:43)
 Don't Worship the Devil (3:41)
 Tenebrae (5:19)
 Too Much Money (3:24)
 Green Bouzard (1:00)
 Old Town (1:58)
 Times Is Weird (4:42)

References 

2007 albums
John Maus albums